David Archard Williams  was a Welsh Anglican priest.

Williams was Vicar of Carmarthen, Chancellor of the Diocese of St Davids and Archdeacon of Carmarthen from 1865 to 1879.

References

Archdeacons of Carmarthen
19th-century Welsh Anglican priests